Marist Red Foxes basketball may refer to either of the basketball teams that represent Marist College:
Marist Red Foxes men's basketball
Marist Red Foxes women's basketball